Hiền Ninh may refer to several places in Vietnam, including:

 , a rural commune of Sóc Sơn District.
 Hiền Ninh, Quảng Bình, a rural commune of Quảng Ninh District.